Velyki Luchky is a village in the Mukachevo Raion (district) in the Zakarpattia Oblast (province) in southwestern Ukraine.

History
Historically, it was part of the Kingdom of Hungary.  Between WWI and WWII, it was part of Carpathian Ruthenia, Czechoslovakia.  After WWII, it was part of the Soviet Union.

Velyki Luchky has been part of Ukraine since 1991.

Jewish Life 
The Jewish population was decimated during WWII. The Jewish community of the village continued up to the mid 70s, when the majority were allowed to leave the Soviet Union and migrated to Israel and the USA.

Coat of arms

Velyki Luchky has its own coat of arms with three stalks of corn on a silver background.

References

External links
Velikiye Luchki, Ukraine, KehilaLinks

Villages in Mukachevo Raion